This is a comprehensive listing of official releases by Los Angeles-based indie rock band Rilo Kiley.

Albums

Studio albums

Compilation albums

EPs

Singles

Music videos

Compilation appearances

See also
 Jenny Lewis
 Jenny Lewis discography
 Blake Sennett
 The Elected
 The Postal Service
 Night Terrors of 1927
 Broken Social Scene

References

Discographies of American artists
Rock music group discographies